Krzysztof Gawędzki (2 July 1947 – 21 January 2022) was a Polish-born French mathematical physicist.

Education and career
Born in Poland, Gawędzki received in 1971 his doctorate from the University of Warsaw.

In the 1980s Gawędzki did research at CNRS at the IHES near Paris. He was a professor at the École normale supérieure de Lyon (ENS de Lyon), and later an emeritus researcher there.

He was known for his research in the mathematics of quantum field theory (QFT), especially conformal field theory. In the 1980s he collaborated with Antti Kupiainen on the application of the renormalization group method in the rigorous mathematical treatment of various model systems of quantum field theory. Much of their research deals with conformal field theories, which serve as two-dimensional toy models of non-perturbative aspects of QFT (with applications to string theory and statistical mechanics). Gawędzki and collaborators studied the geometry of WZW models (also called WZNW models, Wess-Zumino-Novikov-Witten models), prototypes for rational conformal field theories.

With Kupiainen he succeeded in the 1980s in the rigorous construction of the massless lattice  model in four dimensions and the Gross-Neveu model in two space-time dimensions. At about the same time, this was achieved by Roland Sénéor, Jacques Magnen, Joel Feldman and Vincent Rivasseau. This was considered an outstanding achievement in constructive quantum field theory.

In 1986 Gawędzki identified the Kalb–Ramond field (B field), which generalizes the electromagnetic field from point particles to strings, as a degree-3 cocycle in the Deligne cohomology model.

In the 2000s he did research on turbulence, partly in collaboration with Kupiainen. In 1995 Gawędzki and Kupiainen demonstrated anomalous scaling behavior of scalar advection in random vector field models of homogeneous turbulence.

From January to June 2003 he was at the Institute for Advanced Study. In 1986 he was invited speaker with talk Renormalization: from magic to mathematics at the International Congress of Mathematicians in Berkeley. In 2007 at ENS de Lyon a conference on mathematical physics was held in honor of his 60th birthday. In 2017 at the University of Nice Sophia Antipolis a conference on mathematical physics was held in honor of his 70th birthday.

On 24 November 2021, the American Institute of Physics and the American Physical Society announced Krzysztof Gawędzki and Antti Kupiainen as the recipients of the 2022 Dannie Heineman Prize for Mathematical Physics.

He died in Lyon, France on 21 January 2022, at the age of 74.

Selected publications

References

External links
 
 

1947 births
2022 deaths
20th-century Polish mathematicians
20th-century Polish physicists
21st-century Polish mathematicians
21st-century Polish physicists
Academic staff of the École Normale Supérieure
Mathematical physicists
University of Warsaw alumni